Aguilar de Codés is a town and municipality located in the province and autonomous community of Navarra, northern Spain. The name "Codés" comes from neighboring Sierra de Codés, that closes the northern end of the valley where Aguilar lies.

References

External links
 
 Aguillar de Codés in the Bernardo Estornés Lasa - Auñamendi Encyclopedia (Euskomedia fondoak) 
 

Municipalities in Navarre